Sheshan Fernando (born 13 November 1999) is a Sri Lankan cricketer. He made his first-class debut on 15 February 2018, for Chilaw Marians Cricket Club in the 2017–18 Premier League Tournament. He made his List A debut on 15 December 2019, for Negombo Cricket Club in the 2019–20 Invitation Limited Over Tournament. He made his Twenty20 debut on 4 January 2020, for Negombo Cricket Club in the 2019–20 SLC Twenty20 Tournament.

References

External links
 

1999 births
Living people
Sri Lankan cricketers
Chilaw Marians Cricket Club cricketers
Negombo Cricket Club cricketers
Place of birth missing (living people)